Maddison Brooks (born 23 September 2004) is a field hockey player from Australia.

Personal life
Maddison Brooks was born and raised in Hobart, Tasmania. She comes from a hockey family, with her mother and twin sister both representing Tasmania at a senior level.

Career

Domestic league
In Hockey Australia's domestic league, the Sultana Bran Hockey One, Brooks is a member of the Tassie Tigers.

Under–21
Brooks made her junior international debut in 2022 at the Junior Oceania Cup in Canberra. She was a member of the Jillaroos squad that won gold.

Hockeyroos
In 2023, Brooks debuted for the Hockeyroos during the FIH Pro League matches against Argentina in Hobart.

References

External links

2004 births
Living people
Australian female field hockey players
Female field hockey midfielders
People from Tasmania